The Ranfurly Shield, colloquially known as the Log o' Wood, is perhaps the most prestigious trophy in New Zealand's domestic rugby union competition. First played for in 1904, the Ranfurly Shield is based on a challenge system, rather than a league or knockout competition as with most football trophies. The holding union must defend the Shield in challenge matches, and if a challenger defeats them, they become the new holder of the Shield.

Holders
Three unions held the Ranfurly Shield between 1910 and 1919, however due to the outbreak of World War I no matches were played between 1915 and 1918.

Fixtures

1910

1911

1912

1913

1914

1919

References
 https://web.archive.org/web/20100525200417/http://www.scrum.co.nz/Ranfurly_Shield_1910-1919.asp

1910-19
1910 in New Zealand rugby union
1911 in New Zealand rugby union
1912 in New Zealand rugby union
1913 in New Zealand rugby union
1914 in New Zealand rugby union
1919 in New Zealand rugby union